The 2014 season was the Houston Dash's inaugural season as a professional women's soccer team. As the first expansion team to the National Women's Soccer League, United States' top-flight women's league, the Dash played a 24-game schedule that saw them compete against the eight other NWSL teams, playing each at home and away at least once. The Dash finished the season in last place and ended the season with 5 wins, 3 draws, and 16 losses and a -21 goal differential. The season for the Dash began on April 12, 2014, and concluded August 20, 2014 after the team failed to qualify for the playoffs.

Background
On November 19, 2013, the Houston Dynamo began the initial talks of bringing a top flight women's professional soccer franchise to Houston. Just a week later, the effort was bolstered when the Dynamo began accepting refundable deposits for a potential NWSL expansion team. On December 11, 2013, the National Women's Soccer League announced that the Houston Dynamo and the city of Houston were awarded an expansion franchise to begin playing in the 2014 season. The following day, the Houston Dynamo held a press conference at BBVA Compass Stadium to formally announce the expansion club to the local and national media.

During the press conference on December 12, 2013, Houston Dynamo President Chris Canetti announced that the club would be named the Houston Dash and would share similar colors to the Dynamo: orange, black, and sky blue. The crest, which features a soccer ball along with the words "Houston Dash" with sky blue lines in the background, was unveiled. Also present at the announcement were Houston Mayor Annise Parker and NWSL Executive Director Cheryl Bailey.

On December 23, 2013, former Houston Dynamo player Brian Ching was named "managing director", putting him in charge of day-to-day duties on both the business and technical sides of under the supervision of Houston Dash and Dynamo team president Chris Canetti. Later that week, Ching hired former U.S. women's national team and FIFA Women's World Cup winning coach Tony DiCicco as a consultant to help the Dash in their search for a head coach and building a roster for the first season in the National Women's Soccer League.

On January 3, 2014, Randy Waldrum was named as the Dash's first head coach, having previously coached the Notre Dame Fighting Irish women's soccer team to two national titles. The first players to be named to the roster (Whitney Engen, Teresa Noyola and Melissa Tancredi) were awarded through the 2014 NWSL Player Allocation. Within a few days Tancredi was traded to the Chicago Red Stars for the Dash's first goalkeeper, Erin McLeod. The Dash later bolstered their roster with 10 additional players through the 2014 NWSL Expansion Draft.

The Dash then went on to trade Danesha Adams to the Washington Spirit for Stephanie Ochs and sent their 3rd pick in the 2014 NWSL College Draft to Chicago for Bianca Henninger to round out their off-season moves before the draft. The club also announced details of an open tryout for aspiring female soccer players born in 1996 and older to be held on Saturday, February 15 at Houston Amateur Sports Park. Dash head coach Randy Waldrum and managing director Brian Ching will evaluate all participants.  Those identified as the tryout's best players will receive an invitation to participate with the team during its pre-season, scheduled to begin on March 10.

The second annual NWSL College Draft took place on January 17, 2014, in conjunction with the NSCAA Convention in Philadelphia. The draft order was determined by the final 2013 NWSL regular season standings. Because the Dash were not part of the 2013 season, their position in the draft was to be decided. Initially, according to reports, the Dash were to pick fifth in the first round (between the four teams that missed the 2013 playoffs and the four that made the playoffs), and first in the second and fourth rounds.  After the 2014 allocations were released, this was later updated to give Houston the second pick in the first round and the first pick in the third round. After trading for an additional pick on draft day, the Dash left the college draft with four more players on their roster.

Draft Notes:

The Houston Dash followed their draft moves by acquiring their first international signing, Japanese defender and 2011 FIFA Women's World Cup winner Aya "Same" Sameshima, on January 24, 2014. Per team and league policy, terms of the deal were not disclosed.

The Dash began the month of February by revealing their on-field look for 2014 with the unveiling of three sets of Nike kits on February 7 in the West Club of BBVA Compass Stadium. The home uniform features an orange jersey with white shorts, while the alternate uniform is a light blue shirt with white shorts. The Dash will wear a white top with orange and light blue on the sleeves with orange shorts for daily training sessions. BBVA Compass was also announced as the jersey sponsor, signing on a 5-year commitment.

BBVA Compass Houston City President Mark Montgomery said the bank will work with the Dash on several community initiatives, including renovating a house and hosting a youth soccer clinic in the East End, which will help introduce Houston's newest sports stars to their adopted city. The efforts will further the bank's partnership with the Dynamo and Dynamo Charities for their Building a Better Houston campaign, which was started in 2012 to revitalize the neighborhood around BBVA Compass Stadium.

On February 8, the club hosted "Dash Day" to give fans a first opportunity to meet players of the team before the start of the season. Fans would have the option to obtain player autographs, participate in Q&A and photo sessions.

On February 15, over 140 young women from the Houston area showed up at Houston Sports Park to tryout for the team's final roster spot in front of Head Coach Randy Waldrum and Managing Director Brian Ching. To round out news in February, Brian Ching confirmed KKHH radio host Sarah Pepper as the Dash's in-stadium announcer.

Season review

Preseason
The Dash began their first preseason camp on March 10 at Houston Sports Park. Their first ever scrimmage took place on March 19 in a 4-0 defeat of the Rice Owls women's soccer team at HSP. After a Rice own goal gave them the lead, rookie Jordan Jackson and trialist Dominique Richardson alternated setting each other up for the second and third goals of the Dash before Teresa Noyola scored the fourth off a Kealia Ohai assist.

Three days later they picked up their second preseason win, 1-0, over the 2013 SEC Champion Texas A&M Aggies women's soccer team after Kealia Ohai got her first goal of the preseason from a Tiffany McCarty assist. Four days later, the Dash would have their first defeat of the preseason in a 3-1 loss to the Houston Dynamo Academy Under 15 boys team. The Dash would regroup and defeat the visiting Texas Tech Lady Raiders the following Saturday in a 7-0 win. The Dash then traveled up the road to College Station to face the Aggies at their place, where they would win 3-1 against the SEC Champions. The Houston Dash capped off their season by defeating cross-town club Houston Aces 7-1 in their BBVA Compass Stadium debut, exactly one week before their NWSL inaugural match.

On Monday, April 7, the Dash announced their 18-player roster for the NWSL season. The club also signed four more players before the first match of the season. The players signed were Lindsay Elston, Holly Hein, Osinachi Ohale and Dominique Richardson.

Colours: Green = Houston Dash win; Yellow = draw; Red = opponents win.

April
The Houston Dash debuted at home against the defending NWSL Champion Portland Thorns FC in front of  8,097 fans, the largest attendance for the first week of the season. Portland won 1-0, despite playing without Alex Morgan, on a game-winner by Allie Long. The Dash's Becky Edwards seemed to have scored the tying goal in stoppage time but her goal was ruled offside and the match ended shortly after. The Dash traveled to Harvard Stadium the following Sunday to face the Boston Breakers. Heather O'Reilly scored immediately within the first minute of play and would later assist Joanna Lohman in the 70th minute to overcome Ella Masar's tying goal in the 50th minute of the match. The home team held the lead and looked to be the victor into the last 10 minutes of play. A brace by Teresa Noyola, her second goal coming from a penalty kick, were enough to see the Dash shock the home crowd and earn their first franchise win. The Dash ended the month of April by visiting the league-leader Seattle Reign FC. Kim Little led the way for the Reign with two first-half goals (the only goals of the evening) as the team remained unbeaten and untied to top the NWSL standings.

May
The Houston Dash returned home to begin the most heavily scheduled month of its season. The first of these seven games featured FC Kansas City's star-studded squad of 2013 NWSL MVP Lauren Holiday, 2013 NWSL Defender of the Year Becky Sauerbrunn, 2013 NWSL Rookie of the Year Erika Tymrak, 2013 NWSL Goalkeeper of the Year Nicole Barnhart, along with United States national team players Amy LePeilbet and Amy Rodriguez. Kansas City came off a season that saw them sweep the 2013 NWSL awards with Vlatko Andonovski being named the coach of the year. The Blues proved to be too much star power for the Dash and cruised to a 4-nil victory, which saw the Dash left with 10 women after Osinachi Ohale's red card in the 58th minute.

The following week the Dash traveled to face the Chicago Red Stars at the Village of Lisle-Benedictine University Sports Complex. After a three-hour severe weather delay, the Houston Dash lost 1-nil to the Chicago Red Stars and fell to 1-4-0 (3 points) for the season. Dash goalkeeper Bianca Henninger made her first appearance, starting in place of the injured Erin McLeod, and held down the Houston defense with several diving saves until the 33rd minute, when a misplayed ball by Arianna Romero ended up at the feet of Chicago's Jen Hoy, who chipped Henninger and found the back of the net. The Houston Dash then returned to BBVA Compass Stadium to play a rematch of their inaugural NWSL match against the defending champion Portland Thorns FC. The rematch ended with the same result as the first time with Portland winning 1-nil, this time with a second-half goal by Jessica McDonald.

On May 18, the Houston Dash came from behind twice to earn a 2-2 draw on the road against FC Kansas City, ending their four-game losing streak and obtaining the first draw in franchise history. On May 23, the Houston Dash finally got their first goal at BBVA Compass Stadium, but it wasn't enough to get their first points at home as they fell 3-1 to the Chicago Red Stars. Three days later, the Dash came from behind twice to equalize before conceding a heart-breaking goal in stoppage time to lose 3-2 to the Washington Spirit. The Dash would finally close out one of their comebacks on the last day of the month in a 2-1 win at Abby Wambach's Western New York Flash. The win was the second in franchise history and featured goals from Kealia Ohai (her first for the club) and Nina Burger.

Club

Coaching staff
{| class="wikitable"
|-
!Position
!Staff
|-
|Head Coach|| Randy Waldrum
|-
|Assistant coach ||  Lee Cullip
|-
|Goalkeeper coach||  Steve Branz
|-
|Head Athletic Trainer||  Kristy Chavez

Other information

 Gabriel Brener
|-
||President of Business Operations|| Chris Canetti 
|-

Squad
The following is the final list of players who were under contract with the Houston Dash up till the last day of the season. Players that were traded, waived, or otherwise removed from the team have been omitted but their stats may be found in the statistics section of this page.
Where a player has not declared an international allegiance, nation is determined by place of birth. Squad correct as of August 20, 2014.

NWSL roster
The active roster consists of 18-20 players, per NWSL rules. The following list is of players that were active for NWSL play on the last day season. Injured players are not included.
Where a player has not declared an international allegiance, nation is determined by place of birth. Squad correct as of August 20, 2014.

Statistics

Appearances and goals 

                                                                 

|-
|colspan="14"|Players who left the club during the season: (Statistics shown are the appearances made and goals scored with the Houston Dash)

Top scorers 
Includes all competitive matches. The list is sorted by shirt number when total goals are equal.

{| class="wikitable" style="font-size: 95%; text-align: center;"
|-
!  style="width:15px; background:#ff8000; color:white; text-align:center;"|
!  style="width:15px; background:#ff8000; color:white; text-align:center;"|
!  style="width:15px; background:#ff8000; color:white; text-align:center;"|
!  style="width:15px; background:#ff8000; color:white; text-align:center;"|
!  style="width:225px; background:#ff8000; color:white; text-align:center;"|Name	
!  style="width:125px; background:#ff8000; color:white; text-align:center;"|NWSL Regular Season
|-
||1 
|7
|FW
|
|Kealia Ohai
|4
|-
||2
|12
|FW
|
|Tiffany McCarty
|4
|-
||3
|19
|FW
|
|Nina Burger
|4
|-
||4
|10
|MF
|
|Teresa Noyola
|3
|-
||5
|30
|FW
|
|Ella Masar
|3
|-
||6
|8
|MF
|
|Jordan Jackson
|2
|-
||7
|20
|DF
|
|Osinachi Ohale
|1
|-
||8
|23
|DF
|
|Marissa Diggs
|1
|-
|colspan="4"|
! style="background:#ff8000; color:white; text-align:center;"|TOTAL
! style="background:#ff8000; color:white; text-align:center;"|17

Italic: denotes no longer with club.

Top assists 

Includes all competitive matches. The list is sorted by shirt number when total assists are equal.	
{| class="wikitable" style="font-size: 95%; text-align: center;"	
|-	
!  style="width:15px; background:#ff8000; color:white; text-align:center;"|	
!  style="width:15px; background:#ff8000; color:white; text-align:center;"|	
!  style="width:15px; background:#ff8000; color:white; text-align:center;"|	
!  style="width:15px; background:#ff8000; color:white; text-align:center;"|	
!  style="width:225px; background:#ff8000; color:white; text-align:center;"|Name	
!  style="width:125px; background:#ff8000; color:white; text-align:center;"|NWSL Regular Season
!  style="width:125px; background:#ff8000; color:white; text-align:center;"|NWSL Championship Playoffs
!  style="width:55px; background:#ff8000; color:white; text-align:center;"|Total	
|-
||1
|22
|DF
|
|Stephanie Ochs
|3
|0
|3
|-
||2
|14
|MF
|
|Becky Edwards
|2
|0
|2
|-
||3
|2
|DF
|
|Arianna Romero
|1
|0
|1
|-
||4
|6
|FW
|
|Rafaelle Souza
|1
|0
|1
|-
||5
|7
|FW
|
|Kealia Ohai
|1
|0
|1
|-
||6
|9
|MF
|
|Kaylyn Kyle
|1
|0
|1
|-
||7
|19
|FW
|
|Nina Burger
|1
|0
|1
|-
||8
|30
|FW
|
|Ella Masar
|1
|0
|1
|-
|colspan="4"|
! style="background:#ff8000; color:white; text-align:center;"|TOTALS
! style="background:#ff8000; color:white; text-align:center;"|11
! style="background:#ff8000; color:white; text-align:center;"|0
! style="background:#ff8000; color:white; text-align:center;"|11

Italic: denotes no longer with club.

Clean sheets 
Includes all competitive matches. The list is sorted by shirt number when total clean sheets are equal.

{| class="wikitable" style="font-size: 95%; text-align: center;"
|-
!  style="width:15px; background:#ff8000; color:white; text-align:center;"|
!  style="width:15px; background:#ff8000; color:white; text-align:center;"|
!  style="width:15px; background:#ff8000; color:white; text-align:center;"|
!  style="width:15px; background:#ff8000; color:white; text-align:center;"|
!  style="width:225px; background:#ff8000; color:white; text-align:center;"|Name	
!  style="width:125px; background:#ff8000; color:white; text-align:center;"|NWSL Regular Season
|-
||1
|1
|GK
|
|Erin McLeod
|2
|-
|colspan="4"|
! style="background:#ff8000; color:white; text-align:center;"|TOTAL
! style="background:#ff8000; color:white; text-align:center;"|2

Italic: denotes no longer with club.

Disciplinary record 
Includes all competitive matches. The list is sorted by shirt number when total cards are equal.

{| class="wikitable" style="font-size: 95%; text-align: center;"
|-
| rowspan="2"  style="width:2.5%;background:#ff8000; text-align:center; color:white;"|
| rowspan="2"  style="width:3%;background:#ff8000; text-align:center; color:white;"|
| rowspan="2"  style="width:3%;background:#ff8000; text-align:center; color:white;"|
| rowspan="2"  style="width:3%;background:#ff8000; text-align:center; color:white;"|
| rowspan="2"  style="width:15%;background:#ff8000; text-align:center; color:white;"|Name
| colspan="3" style="text-align:center;background:#ff8000; color:white;"|NWSL Regular Season
| colspan="3" style="text-align:center;background:#ff8000; color:white;"|NWSL Championship Playoffs
| colspan="3" style="text-align:center;background:#ff8000; color:white;"|Total
|-
!  style="width:25px; background:#fe9;"|
!  style="width:28px; background:#ff8888;"|
!  style="width:25px; background:#ff8888;"|
!  style="width:25px; background:#fe9;"|
!  style="width:28px; background:#ff8888;"|
!  style="width:25px; background:#ff8888;"|
!  style="width:25px; background:#fe9;"|
!  style="width:28px; background:#ff8888;"|
!  style="width:25px; background:#ff8888;"|
|-
||1
|20
|DF
|
|Osinachi Ohale
|3
|0
|1
|0
|0
|0
|2
|0
|1
|-
||2
|30
|FW
|
|Ella Masar
|4
|0
|0
|0
|0
|0
|3
|0
|0
|-
||3
|7
|FW
|
|Kealia Ohai
|1
|0
|0
|0
|0
|0
|1
|0
|0
|-
||4
|18
|GK
|
|Bianca Henninger
|1
|0
|0
|0
|0
|0
|1
|0
|0
|-
||5
|19
|FW
|
|Nina Burger
|1
|0
|0
|0
|0
|0
|1
|0
|0
|-
||6
|21
|DF
|
|Holly Hein
|1
|0
|0
|0
|0
|0
|1
|0
|0
|-
|colspan="4"|
! style="background:#ff8000; color:white; text-align:center;"|TOTALS
! style="background:#ff8000; color:white; text-align:center;"|11
! style="background:#ff8000; color:white; text-align:center;"|0
! style="background:#ff8000; color:white; text-align:center;"|1
! style="background:#ff8000; color:white; text-align:center;"|0
! style="background:#ff8000; color:white; text-align:center;"|0
! style="background:#ff8000; color:white; text-align:center;"|0
! style="background:#ff8000; color:white; text-align:center;"|11
! style="background:#ff8000; color:white; text-align:center;"|0
! style="background:#ff8000; color:white; text-align:center;"|1
|-

Italic: denotes no longer with club.

Captains 
Includes all competitive matches. The list is sorted by shirt number when games are equal.

{| class="wikitable" style="text-align:center"
|-
!  style="background:#ff8000; color:white; text-align:center; width:10%;"|No.
!  style="background:#ff8000; color:white; text-align:center; width:10%;"|Pos.
!  style="background:#ff8000; color:white; text-align:center; width:40%;"|Name
!  style="background:#ff8000; color:white; text-align:center; width:20%;"|Games
|-
|1
|GK
| Erin McLeod
| style="text-align:center;"|13
|-
|30
|FW
| Ella Masar
| style="text-align:center;"|3
|-

Italic: denotes no longer with club.

Team statistics 
{|class="wikitable" style="text-align: center;"
|-
! style="background:#ff8000; color:white; text-align:center;"| !! style="background:#ff8000; color:white; text-align:center;"|Total !! style="background:#ff8000; color:white; text-align:center;"|Home !! style="background:#ff8000; color:white; text-align:center;"|Away
|-
|align=left| Games played                 || 15 || 8 || 7
|-
|align=left| Games won                    || 4 || 1 || 3
|-
|align=left| Games drawn                  || 1 || 0 || 1
|-
|align=left| Games lost                   || 10 || 7 || 3
|-
|align=left| Biggest win                  || 3-0 at Sky Blue || 2-1 vs. Western New York ||  3-0 at Sky Blue
|-
|align=left| Biggest win (League)         || 3-0 at Sky Blue || 2-1 vs. Western New York || 3-0 at Sky Blue
|-
|align=left| Biggest win (Playoffs)       || n/a || n/a || n/a
|-
|align=left| Biggest loss                 || 0-4 vs. FC Kansas City || 0-4 vs. FC Kansas City || 0-2 at Seattle Reign FC
|-
|align=left| Biggest loss (League)        || 0-4 vs. FC Kansas City || 0-4 vs. FC Kansas City || 0-2 at Seattle Reign FC
|-
|align=left| Biggest loss (Playoffs)      || n/a || n/a || n/a
|-
|align=left| Clean sheets                 || 1 || 0 || 1
|-
|align=left| Goals scored                 || 17 || 5 || 12
|-
|align=left| Goals conceded               || 28 || 17 || 11
|-
|align=left| Goal difference              || -11 || -12 || +1
|-
|-
|-
|align=left| Yellow cards    || 11 || 4 || 7
|-
|align=left| Red cards       || 1 || 1 || 0
|-
|align=left| Most appearances ||align=left|  3 players tied at 15 ||align=left|  4 players tied at 8 ||align=left|  4 players tied at 7
|-
|align=left| Top scorer       ||align=left|  Tiffany McCarty  4   ||align=left|  4 players tied at 1  ||align=left|  Tiffany McCarty 3 
|-
|align=left|Worst discipline  ||align=left|  Osinachi Ohale 2  1  ||align=left|  Osinachi Ohale 1  ||align=left|  2 players tied at 2 
|-
|align=left|Penalties for      || 2/4 50% || 1/3 33.33% || 1/1 100%
|-
|align=left|Penalties against  || 2/3 66.67% || 1/1 100% || 1/2 50%
|-
|align=left| Points (League)   || 13 28.88% || 3 12.50% || 10 47.62%
|-
|align=left| Winning rate      || 26.67% || 12.50% || 42.86%
|-

International call-ups 

 Sesselmann was called up to the Canadian national team for the Cypress Cup but was not available for the tournament for cause of injury.

Transfers

In

Out

Trialists
Players on trial are invited to train with the team but do not have a contract with the club.

Standings and match results

National Women's Soccer League

League standings

Results summary

Results by matchday

Matches

Squad statistics
Key to positions: FW – Forward, MF – Midfielder, DF – Defender, GK – Goalkeeper

Honors and awards

NWSL Player of the Week

References 

Houston Dash seasons
Houston Dash
Houston Dash
Houston Dash